V-type proton ATPase subunit C 1 is an enzyme that in humans is encoded by the ATP6V1C1 gene.

This gene encodes a component of vacuolar ATPase (V-ATPase), a multisubunit enzyme that mediates acidification of intracellular compartments of eukaryotic cells. V-ATPase dependent acidification is necessary for such intracellular processes as protein sorting, zymogen activation, receptor-mediated endocytosis, and synaptic vesicle proton gradient generation. V-ATPase is composed of a cytosolic V1 domain and a transmembrane V0 domain. The V1 domain consists of three A and three B subunits, two G subunits plus the C, D, E, F, and H subunits. The V1 domain contains the ATP catalytic site. The V0 domain consists of five different subunits: a, c, c', c'', and d. Additional isoforms of many of the V1 and V0 subunit proteins are encoded by multiple genes or alternatively spliced transcript variants. This gene is one of two genes that encode the V1 domain C subunit proteins and is found ubiquitously. This C subunit is analogous but not homologous to gamma subunit of F-ATPases. Previously, this gene was designated ATP6D.

In melanocytic cells ATP6V1C1 gene expression may be regulated by MITF.

References

Further reading

External links